The Antelope Valley is located in northern Los Angeles County, California, and the southeast portion of Kern County, California, and constitutes the western tip of the Mojave Desert. It is situated between the Tehachapi, Sierra Pelona, and the San Gabriel Mountains.  The valley was named for the pronghorns that roamed there until they were all eliminated in the 1880s, mostly by hunting, or resettled in other areas. The principal cities in the Antelope Valley are Palmdale and Lancaster.

Geography
The Antelope Valley comprises the western tip of the Mojave Desert, opening up to the Victor Valley and the Great Basin to the east. The valley is bounded by the Garlock and San Andreas fault systems. Precipitation in the surrounding mountain ranges contributes to groundwater recharge.

Flora and fauna

The Antelope Valley is home to a wide range of plants and animals. This includes hundreds of plants such as the California juniper, Joshua tree, California scrub oak, creosote, and wildflowers, notably the California poppy. Winter brings much-needed rain, which slowly penetrates the area's dry ground, bringing up native grasses and wildflowers. Poppy season depends completely on the precipitation, but a good bloom can be killed off by the unusual weather in the late winter and early spring.

The Antelope Valley gets its name from its history of pronghorn grazing in large numbers. In 1882-85, the valley lost 30,000 head of antelope, almost half of the species for which it was named. Unusually heavy snows in both the mountains and the valley floor drove the antelope toward their normal feeding grounds in the eastern part of the valley. Since they would not cross the railroad tracks, many of them starved to death. The remainder of these pronghorns were hunted for their hides by settlers. Once abundant, they either died off or migrated into the Central Valley. A drought in the early 1900s caused a scarcity in bunch grass, their main food source. Now, the sighting of a pronghorn is rare, although a small number remain in the western portion of the valley.

Common game species in the Antelope Valley include mule deer and mountain quail. Other common species in the Antelope Valley include the golden-mantled ground squirrel, Beechey ground squirrel, red-tailed hawk, Cooper's hawk, Stellar's jay, leopard frog, and rattlesnake. Other animals in the Antelope Valley are bobcats, mountain lions, and coyotes.

Water issues
Human water use in the Antelope Valley depends mainly on pumping of groundwater from the valley's aquifers and on importing additional water from the California Aqueduct. Long-term groundwater pumping has lowered the water table, thereby increasing pumping lifts, reducing well efficiency, and causing land subsidence.

While aqueducts supply additional water that meets increasing human demand for agricultural, industrial, and domestic uses, diversion of water from the Sacramento-San Joaquin River Delta in northern California has caused and causes adverse environmental and social effects in the delta: "Over decades, [the] competing uses for water supply and habitat have jeopardized the Delta's ability to meet either need. All stakeholders agree the estuary is in trouble and requires long-term solutions to ensure reliable, quality water supplies and a healthy ecosystem."

The Antelope Valley's population growth and development place considerable stress on the local and regional water systems. According to David Leighton of the United States Geological Survey: "A deliberate management effort will be required to meet future water demand in the Antelope Valley without incurring significant economic and environmental costs associated with overuse of the ground-water resource."

Human history

The first peoples of the Antelope Valley include the Kawaiisu,  Kitanemuk, Serrano, and Tataviam. Europeans first entered in the 1770s, during the colonization of North America. Father Francisco Garcés, a Spanish Franciscan friar, is believed to have traveled the west end of the valley in 1776. The Spanish established El Camino Viejo through the western part of the valley between Los Angeles and the missions of the San Francisco Bay in the 1780s.  By 1808, the Spanish had moved the native people out of the valley and into missions.

Jedediah Smith came through in 1827, and John C. Fremont made a scientific observation of the valley in 1844. After Fremont's visit the 49ers crossed the valley via the Old Tejon Pass into the San Joaquin Valley on their way to the gold fields. Later, a better wagon road, the Stockton – Los Angeles Road route to Tejon Pass, followed in 1854. Stagecoach lines across the southern foothills came through the valley along this wagon road, and were the preferred method for travelers before the coming of the Southern Pacific Railroad in 1876. The rail service linking the valley to the Central Valley and Los Angeles started its first large influx of white settlers, and farms and towns soon sprouted on the valley floor. The aircraft (now called aerospace) industry took hold in the valley at Plant 42 in 1952. Edwards AFB, then called Muroc Army Air Field, was established in 1933.

Demographics
In recent decades, the valley has become a bedroom community to the Greater Los Angeles area. Major housing-tract development and population growth took off beginning in 1983, which has increased the population of Palmdale around 12 times its former size as of 2006. Neighboring Lancaster has increased its population since the early 1980s to around three times its former level. Major retail has followed the population influx, centered on Palmdale's Antelope Valley Mall. The Lancaster—Palmdale urbanized area is home to 353,619 people.

Non-Hispanic Whites make up about 48% of the population of the Antelope Valley and form a majority or plurality in most of its cities and towns. Hispanics are the next-largest group, followed by African Americans and Asian Americans.

Some long-term residents living far out in the desert have been cited by Los Angeles County's nuisance abatement teams for code violations, forcing residents to either make improvements or move. One of the properties is a church building that was used as a filming location for Kill Bill. The code enforcers have arrived on some of their visits in SWAT-team formats.

Military base

Edwards Air Force Base lies east of Rosamond, 37 miles (60 km) northeast of Palmdale. Edwards AFB's dry lakebeds are the lowest geographic elevation in the valley.
Significant numbers of U.S. military test flights are performed there, and it has been the site of many important aeronautical accomplishments, including the first flight to break the sound barrier, accomplished by Chuck Yeager.

NASA Space Shuttles originally landed at Edwards because the lake beds offer a vast landing area. Although NASA later built a landing strip at Kennedy Space Center, Edwards was retained as the backup in case of bad weather at Cape Canaveral.

NASA Neil A. Armstrong Flight Research Center is a tenant organization at Edwards AFB. The center is best known for the X-15 experimental rocket ship program. It has been the home of NASA's high-performance aircraft research since it was founded for the X-1 program. The Space Shuttle orbiter was serviced there when it landed at Edwards.

Industry

Aerospace

U. S. Air Force Plant 42 in northeast Palmdale is home to Lockheed Martin, Boeing, Northrop Grumman, and BAE Systems, among other aerospace-related companies. Notable projects assembled and/or designed there include the Space Shuttle orbiters, B-1 Lancer bombers, B-2 Spirit bombers, F-117 Nighthawk fighters, F-35 Joint Strike Fighters, and Lockheed L-1011 Tristar passenger jets.

This region also houses the newly dedicated Mojave Air and Space Port. The spaceport is famous as the base of operations for Scaled Composites, the company that designed SpaceShipOne and won the X-Prize.

Much of the work done at these facilities is performed in coordination with Edwards Air Force Base and the NASA Dryden Flight Research Center (see above), from the creation and testing of proof-of-concept X-planes, to Space Shuttle operations, to the manufacturing and integration and testing of new military aviation equipment.

With the size of the industry there, Antelope Valley has been nicknamed the Aerospace Valley.

Agriculture
The valley's first main industry as a part of the United States was agriculture. Historically known in the region for its extensive alfalfa fields and fruit crops, farmers now are growing a wider variety of crops, such as carrots, onions, lettuce, and potatoes. As housing tracts continue to build in the middle of the valley, the farm operations are found farther to the west and east sides than in earlier decades.

Electricity generation

The northern reaches of Antelope Valley are part of the Tehachapi Wind Resource Area, the largest wind resource area in California. The valley also has numerous solar farms, some of which are among the largest in the United States.

Manufacturing

 U.S. Pole Company Inc.
 Senior Systems Technology
 Delta Scientific
 Lance Camper Manufacturing Corporation
 Harvest Farms Inc.
 BYD Company

Mining
The world's largest open-pit borax mine is located near Boron.

Education

Colleges and universities

 The Antelope Valley Community College District is the local public, regionally accredited, college system that covers the area with a primary service area of  covering portions of Los Angeles and Kern Counties. Instruction is offered at multiple sites, including Palmdale and Lancaster, as well as through online and instructional television courses. It has two campuses. The main one, Antelope Valley College, is a comprehensive community college located in Lancaster. It offers associate in arts and associate in science (two-year) degrees in 67 fields, as well as certificate programs in 56 vocational areas. It also hosts a satellite location of California State University, Bakersfield-Antelope Valley, where students can obtain bachelor's and master's degrees.
 University of Antelope Valley, formerly known as Antelope Valley Medical College, is a private, for-profit, incorporated company. The corporation is owned and operated by Lancaster city councilwoman, Sandra Johnson.<ref>[https://web.archive.org/web/20180330012933/http://www.votesandrajohnson.com/about_sandra/ About Sandra. (2012). Retrieved, Sunday, April 15, 2012, from ]</ref> The facility was featured on a local news report titled "University of Antelope Valley pays employers for jobs", regarding payouts to local businesses that would hire or place graduated students for $2,000. UAV, INC., must place at least 65 percent of its graduates in jobs, or lose accreditation.
 California State University Bakersfield has a satellite campus in Lancaster offering eight bachelor's degrees, five master's degrees, and the multiple, single, and special-education teaching credentials. 
 University of Phoenix has a satellite campus in Lancaster.
 University of La Verne has a satellite campus in Palmdale.
 DeVry University and its Keller Graduate School of Management have a satellite campus in Palmdale.
 Chapman University has a satellite campus in Palmdale.
 The AERO Institute at the Palmdale Institute of Technology is a facility in Palmdale at the Civic Center. It is operated by NASA and the City of Palmdale, and distance learning through a number of universities is available, including Purdue, the University of Southern California, the University of San Diego, Pepperdine University, Embry-Riddle Aeronautical University, Caltech, and Cal Poly Pomona. This specialized school offers graduate and undergraduate education in aerospace science, engineering, and technical skills.
 West Coast Baptist College in Lancaster is an accredited Independent Fundamental Baptist Bible college offering graduate and undergraduate degrees in pastoral studies, evangelism, missions, church ministries, music, Christian education, youth ministry, and secretarial studies. West Coast opened in 1995, and now has about 1,000 students.
 The Lancaster University Center in Lancaster provides local students education in engineering and technology from California State University, Long Beach. The $3.5 million reconstruction of Challenger Hall, located at the old Antelope Valley Fairgrounds, gave the new campus 13 classrooms, two of which are high-tech distance-learning rooms and two of which are lab classrooms, as well as office space. The school was created through partnerships with California State University, Bakersfield, California State University, Fresno, and local aerospace companies. They offer bachelor of science degrees in mechanical and electrical engineering.

High schools
 The Antelope Valley Union High School District is the primary public school district covering the vast majority of high-school education in the metropolitan Palmdale and Lancaster area. The district has 25,000 students in eight regular high schools in Palmdale and Lancaster, a continuation school in each city, a trade school in Palmdale, and a specialized early college education school on the Lancaster Antelope Valley College campus. These are:
 Antelope Valley High School - Lancaster
 Antelope Valley Regional Occupational Program (AV ROP) - Palmdale
 Desert Winds High School - Lancaster
 Eastside High School - Lancaster
 Highland High School - Palmdale
 Lancaster High School - Lancaster
 Littlerock High School - Littlerock, California
 Palmdale High School - Palmdale
 Pete Knight High School - Palmdale
 Quartz Hill High School - Quartz Hill
 R. Rex Parris Continuation High School - Palmdale
 SOAR High School - Lancaster
 The Southern Kern Unified School District provides all public school education in Rosamond.
 The Muroc Joint Unified School District provides all public school education for Edwards Air Force Base, and the northern Antelope Valley communities of North Edwards, and Boron.
 The Mojave Unified School District provides all public school education in the northern Antelope Valley communities of Mojave and California City.

Also, several private and home-school high schools arein the area, most notably:
 Abraham Lincoln High School - Rosamond
 Paraclete High School
 Bethel Christian High School
 Antelope Valley Christian School - Lancaster
 Desert Christian High School
 Empowered Learning Academy - Palmdale
 Palmdale Academy Charter School
 Pearblossom High School
 Desert Sands Charter Schools - Lancaster
 Desert Sands Charter Schools - Palmdale
 Opportunities for Learning Charter Schools - Lancaster
 Opportunities for Learning Charter Schools - Palmdale
 The Palmdale Aerospace Academy

School districts
 The Palmdale School District is the area's largest school district, with an enrollment of over 28,000 in 29 schools. The district covers the central portion of the city.
 The Lancaster School District is the area's third largest school district after Palmdale and the A.V. High School District. This school district covers most of central and part of eastern Lancaster with 15,000 students in 19 schools.
 The Westside Union School District covers western Palmdale and Lancaster and their immediate suburbs including Quartz Hill, Del Sur, Leona Valley, and Antelope Acres. It has over 8,250 students in 11 schools.
 The Eastside Union School District covers eastern Lancaster with 3,500 students in 4 schools.
 The Keppel Union School District covers eastern Palmdale and its immediate suburbs, including the eastern Antelope Valley communities of Lake Los Angeles, Pearblossom, Littlerock, Sun Village, Llano, and Valyermo. It has 6 schools with over 3,000 students.
 The Southern Kern Unified School District provides all public school education in Rosamond.
 The Muroc Joint Unified School District provides all public school education for Edwards Air Force Base, and the northern Antelope Valley communities of North Edwards, and Boron.
 The Mojave Unified School District provides all public school education in the northern Antelope Valley communities of Mojave and California City.

Culture
The Antelope Valley Symphony Orchestra is a professional ensemble that performs four concerts each year at the Lancaster Performing Arts Center. It is an auxiliary of Antelope Valley College, and performs regularly with the Antelope Valley College Civic Orchestra.

 In popular culture 
Antelope Valley Indian Museum State Historic Park has been featured in films such as The Magnificent Seven Ride! (1972) and The Stone Killer (1973). Mackenna's Gold (1964) was also partly filmed in Antelope Valley. The video to the R.E.M. song "Man on the Moon" was shot in Antelope Valley in October 1992.

Parks

 Antelope Valley California Poppy Reserve, home to California's state flower
 Arthur B. Ripley Desert Woodland State Park
 Antelope Valley Indian Museum State Historic Park
 Saddleback Butte State Park
 Devil's Punchbowl County Park

Hospitals
Major hospitals include:
 Antelope Valley Hospital
 Palmdale Regional Medical Center

The Antelope Valley was formerly served by a county hospital, High Desert Hospital, which was converted into an urgent care clinic in 2003 due to the county's budget problems.

Transportation
Major highways and roads
Include:
 Angeles Forest Highway, a key county road, connects Palmdale with Angeles Crest Highway as an alternate route to the Los Angeles basin.
 The Antelope Valley Freeway (State Route 14)
 State Route 18 (connects SR 138 east of Palmdale to Victor Valley and U.S. Route 395) There is currently a proposal to turn this into a freeway.
 State Route 138 (of which Pearblossom Highway comprises the eastern leg)
 State Route 58 (connects the Antelope Valley with Bakersfield and Barstow as a freeway/expressway)
 U.S. Route 395 (which technically lies east of the Valley proper)

On the ridgeline of the San Gabriel Mountains, the Angeles Crest Highway (State Route 2) snakes 60 miles (100 km) through the Angeles National Forest to La Cañada Flintridge and the Greater Los Angeles metropolitan region.

Rail
 Union Pacific serves the Antelope Valley with freight service on their route between Palmdale and Mojave, with continuing service to points south, southeast and north. BNSF Railway serves Mojave with freight service to/from the east, and to/from Richmond, California to the northwest.
 Metrolink passenger rail service to the Los Angeles Basin and other parts of Southern California on its Antelope Valley Line at its Lancaster, Palmdale, and Vincent Grade/Acton stations.
 Amtrak passenger rail service has a commuter bus that stops at the Palmdale Transportation Center and the Lancaster Metrolink station, connecting Antelope Valley residents to the national rail network.
 The California High-Speed Rail authority has designated Palmdale as a stop on the future rail line between San Francisco and San Diego.

Bus
 The Antelope Valley Transit Authority is the local city-bus system for metropolitan Palmdale and Lancaster. The service also operates a commuter bus network from its hubs at the Palmdale Transportation Center and the Lancaster Park & Ride to several locations in Los Angeles.
 Greyhound Bus has stops at the Palmdale Transportation Center and the Lancaster Metrolink station.

Airports
 Palmdale Regional Airport, co-sited with USAF Plant 42 is by far the largest and busiest airport in the valley and is owned by the City of Palmdale via Palmdale Airport Authority (it was previously owned by Los Angeles World Airports which owns and operates LAX up until 2013). Although mostly military flights occur at this airport, it also has an unused commercial terminal.
 General William J. Fox Airfield in Lancaster is the valley's busiest general aviation airport. It is the fourth largest airport in the valley. Charter air service and helicopter rides are available. This airport also has the valley's only aviation school.
 Inyokern Airport in Inyokern, near Ridgecrest, is a large general aviation airport with limited commercial airline service to Los Angeles International Airport, serving the northern Antelope Valley and Indian Wells Valley communities. Charter service is also available. It is the area's third largest airport.
 Mojave Air & Space Port in Mojave is a large civil aviation center and the second largest airport in the valley. Voyager and SpaceShipOne were developed and flown from its location.
 Mountain Valley Airport in Tehachapi is a gliderport, privately owned but open to the public, which offers glider training for civilian and military pilots
 Tehachapi Municipal Airport in Tehachapi is a small general aviation airport.
 Agua Dulce Airpark in Agua Dulce is a medium-sized general aviation airport.
 Rosamond Skypark Airport in Rosamond is a small general aviation airport, privately owned and operated.
 California City Municipal Airport in California City is a small general aviation airport.
 Crystalaire Airport in Llano is a small airstrip principally dedicated to glider flights.

Notable people

Some people of note have spent time in the valley, including:
 The 1990s R&B group All-4-One was from the AV.
 Erik Audé, actor-stuntman turned professional poker player, went to Paraclete High School before transferring over to Bethel Christian.
 Pancho Barnes, the aviator and friend to the U.S. Air Force's test pilots of what is now called Edwards Air Force Base, established the celebrated Happy Bottom Riding Club near Rogers Dry Lake in 1935, later living in Cantil and Boron.
 Linda Blair, award-winning actress notable for her lead in the 1973 film The Exorcist, currently resides in Acton, where she leads the Linda Blair World Heart Foundation.
 Spade Cooley was a Western swing musician, big band leader, actor, and television personality (Willow Springs).
 Michael Deaver, former aide to Ronald Reagan, is a former Mojave resident.
 R. Lee Ermey of Full Metal Jacket and Mail Call fame was a Palmdale resident.
 Joseph Foreman, more frequently known as Afroman, lives in Palmdale.
 Daniel Fry, a contactee, attended Antelope Valley High School in Lancaster during the 1920s.
 Judy Garland, then known in the valley as Frances Gumm. As a girl, she would sing in public to her Lancaster neighbors.
 Paul George, NBA player born and raised in Palmdale, California
 Donald Glover, singer/songwriter known by his stage name Childish Gambino, was born in Edwards Air Force Base.
 Ezra M. Hamilton, a pioneer known for his role in the development of Antelope Valley, California. In 1896, he discovered gold in Rosamond, California and began a successful mining operation that spurred growth in the area. He founded and developed the nearby town of Willow Springs in 1897. 
 Tippi Hedren, who made her major motion picture debut in The Birds, is an Acton resident since at least 1981 (Acton not being in the valley proper, but nearby to the south).
 Aldous Huxley drew writing inspiration from the solitude found at his Llano home. A little known children's book, The Crows of Pearblossom, is set in the valley and is the only children's book he is known to have written.
 Home to members of the punk band Killradio.
 Terence McKenna, noted writer, public speaker, philosopher, psychonaut, and ethnobotanist, graduated from Antelope Valley High School in 1965.
 Debbie Rowe, second wife of Michael Jackson lives in Palmdale, California
 Burt Rutan and his brother Dick Rutan of Scaled Composites, the firm which produced SpaceShipOne and the Voyager aerospace vehicles, work out of Mojave Air & Space Port in Mojave.
 Home to members of the punk band Slick Shoes.
 Kathleen Soliah, who achieved notoriety as a member of the Symbionese Liberation Army in the 1970s and then as a fugitive living a quiet, middle-class life in Saint Paul, Minnesota, grew up in Desert View Highlands, graduating from Palmdale High School in 1965.
 Don Van Vliet (Captain Beefheart) attended Antelope Valley High School in Lancaster, with Frank Zappa.
 John Wayne, then known as Marion Morrison, was briefly a Lancaster schoolboy who was known not to tie up his horse properly when he left it by the street, as was the old time custom.
 Chuck Yeager was an early USAF test pilot at Muroc Army Air Field, now Edwards Air Force Base, where he became the first to break the sound barrier on October 14, 1947.
 Frank Zappa attended Antelope Valley High School in Lancaster, graduating in 1958. He met Don Van Vliet (Captain Beefheart) there, a fellow student.

Cities and communities

Cities over 100,000 population
 Lancaster (population as of 2018, 159,053) - incorporated in 1977
 Palmdale (population as of 2018, 156,667) - incorporated in 1962

Cities less than 100,000 population
 California City (population as of 2018, 14,217) - incorporated in 1965

Unincorporated towns and districts
Over 10,000 population

 Rosamond (18,150)
 Lake Los Angeles (12,328)
 Quartz Hill (10,912)
 Sun Village (11,302)

Under 10,000 population

 Acton (technically in the San Gabriel Mountains) (7,596)
 Agua Dulce (technically in the San Gabriel Mountains) (4,254)
 Antelope Acres (3,059)
 Boron (2,253)
 Cantil
 Del Sur (1,750)
 Desert View Highlands
 Elizabeth Lake (technically in the Leona Valley) (1,756)
 Hi Vista (1,056)
 Inyokern (technically in the Indian Wells Valley)
 Johannesburg
 Juniper Hills (1,101)
 Lake Hughes (technically in the Leona Valley)
 Leona Valley (technically in the Leona Valley)
 Littlerock (1,377)
 Llano (739)
 Mojave (4,238)
 Monolith (technically in the Tehachapi Valley)
 Neenach (560)
 North Edwards
 Pearblossom (2,435)
 Piñon Hills (technically in the Victor Valley)
 Randsburg
 Saltdale
 Valyermo (691)
 Wilsona Gardens (210)
 Willow Springs (1,784)

 See also 

 Aerospace Walk of Honor - downtown Lancaster sidewalk tribute to the U. S. Air Force flight test community.
 Antelope Valley Conservancy - a public benefit organization

References

External links

 Antelope Valley Conservancy
 Antelope Valley Business Directory
 Antelope Valley Press
 Antelope Valley Indian Museum and State Historical Park
 The Geography of Suburban Sprawl in the Antelope Valley — In-depth study of the Valley's historical development and recent (1990s) urban conditions''.
 Groundwater Quality in the Antelope Valley, California United States Geological Survey

 
Valleys of the Mojave Desert
Valleys of Los Angeles County, California
Valleys of Kern County, California
Geography of Palmdale, California
Los Angeles County, California regions
Valleys of California